is a 1996 Japanese horror film directed by Hideyuki Hirayama. It is the second installment in the Gakkō no Kaidan film series, following the 1995 film School Ghost Stories.

Cast
 Hironobu Nomura as Kazunari Asano
 Naomi Nishida as Rika Odagiri
 Kyōko Kishida as Shizuko Tokiwa
 Masakane Yonekura as Jushoku

Reception
The film was chosen as one of the Top 10 Japanese films at the 39th Blue Ribbon Awards and Kyōko Kishida won the Award for Best Supporting Actress.

References

External links
 
 Review  at Sarudama

1996 horror films
Films based on Japanese novels
Films directed by Hideyuki Hirayama
G
Japanese horror films
1996 films
1990s Japanese films

ja:学校の怪談 (映画)#『学校の怪談2』（1996年）
zh:學校怪談 (電影)#1996年電影版